The Gorbio is a short river that flows through the Alpes-Maritimes department of southeastern France. Its source is between the small towns Peille and Gorbio. It flows into the Mediterranean Sea at Roquebrune-Cap-Martin.

References

Rivers of France
Rivers of Alpes-Maritimes
Rivers of Provence-Alpes-Côte d'Azur
0Gorbio